The Bottom of the Blues is an album by blues pianist/vocalist Otis Spann recorded in 1967 and originally released by the BluesWay label.

Track listing
All compositions by Otis Spann except where noted
 "Heart Loaded with Trouble" (James Oden) − 2:58
 "Diving Duck" − 5:25
 "Shimmy Baby" (Muddy Waters) − 3:54
 "Looks Like Twins" (Muddy Waters) − 4:58
 "I'm a Fool" (Lucille Spann) − 3:09
 "My Man" (Lucille Spann) − 3:35
 "Down to Earth" − 4:32
 "Nobody Knows" (Walter Davis) − 4:43
 "Doctor Blues" − 2:50

Personnel
Otis Spann − piano, vocals
George Buford − harmonica
Luther Johnson, Muddy Waters, Sammy Lawhorn − guitar
Sonny Wimberley − bass
S. P. Leary – drums
Lucille Spann − vocals (tracks 3 & 5-7)

References

1968 albums
Otis Spann albums
Albums produced by Bob Thiele
BluesWay Records albums